County Road 261 is a  road in Oppland County, Norway. It runs from Hålimo in the municipality of Vang to Håde in the municipality of Nord-Aurdal, passing through the municipality of Vestre Slidre. The road follows the west sides of Slidre Fjord and Stronda Fjord, and spurs of the road cross the two lakes at the Einang Sound Bridge and the Ulnes Bridge. Cultural heritage sites along the route include the Mo Church Ruins.

References

External links
Statens vegvesen – trafikkmeldinger Fv261 (Traffic Information: County Road 261)

261